Language. Sex. Violence. Other? is a DVD released by Welsh Rock trio, Stereophonics. The DVD includes an in-depth documentary and personal footage from the band and co-producer Jim Lowe. It covers the journey of the band's fifth studio album of the same name, the addition of drummer Javier Weyler and finishes with ten tracks from the band's 2005 world tour featured on their live compilation, Live from Dakota.

Concert track listing
 "Superman"
 "Doorman"
 "Madame Helga"
 "Mr Writer"
 "Local Boy in the Photograph"
 "I'm Alright (You Gotta Go There To Come Back)"
 "Maybe Tomorrow"
 "Deadhead"
 "Just Looking"
 "Dakota"

Videos
All four promo videos for the album Language. Sex. Violence. Other?
 "Dakota"
 "Superman"
 "Devil"
 "Rewind"

2006 video albums
Stereophonics video albums
V2 Records video albums